Ar'arat an-Naqab or Ar'ara BaNegev, previously called Aroer, is a Bedouin town (local council) in the Southern District of Israel. Its name stands for "the juniper tree in Negev". It is situated not far from the archaeological site of Aroer.

Ar'arat an-Naqab was founded in 1982 as part of a government project to settle Bedouins in permanent settlements. It is one of seven Bedouin townships in the Negev desert with approved plans and developed infrastructure (other six are: Hura, Lakiya, Shaqib al-Salam (Segev Shalom), Kuseife (Kseife), Tel as-Sabi (Tel-Sheva) and the city of Rahat, the largest among them).

Population
Its jurisdiction is 14,052 dunams.

History

Background
Prior to the establishment of Israel, the Negev Bedouins were a semi-nomadic society that had been through a process of sedentariness since the Ottoman rule of the region. Most researches agree that Bedouins arrived to the Negev around year 1800, but there is evidence of earlier migrations as well.

During the British Mandate period the administration didn't provide a legal frame to justify and preserve lands’ ownership. In order to settle this issue, Israel's land policy was adapted to a large extent from the Ottoman land regulations of 1858 as the only preceding legal frame. Thus Israel nationalized most of the Negev lands using the state's land regulations from 1969.

20th century
Israel has continued the policy of sedentarization of Negev Bedouins imposed by the Ottoman authorities, and at first it included regulation and re-location. During the 1950s Israel re-located two-thirds of the Negev Bedouins into an area that was under martial law.

The next step was to establish seven townships built especially for Bedouins in order to sedentarize and urbanize them by offering them better life conditions, proper infrastructure and high quality public services in sanitation, health and education, and municipal services. But not all Bedouins agree to move from tents and structures built on the state lands into apartments prepared for them. In permanent planned villages like Ar'arat an-Naqab lives about 60% of Bedouin citizens of Israel, while the rest in illegal homes spread all over North Negev.

21st century
The rate of unemployment remains high in Bedouin townships, as well as crime level. School through age 16 is mandatory by law, but the vast majority of the population does not receive a high school education. Women are discriminated in the patriarchal-type Bedouin society.

Employment
Despite the fact that unemployment level among Negev Bedouins is high, there are several employment opportunities in the region. Several industrial parks are situated in the area - Ramat Hovav, Hura, there are industrial zones in Beersheba, Arad and Dimona, etc. Other job opportunities are: several chemical plants near the Dead Sea like the Dead Sea Works, different high-tech companies and textile shops. There is a number of Bedouins working in the area of service.

Infrastructure

Medical services
There are branches of several health funds (medical clinics) in Ar'arat an-Naqab: Leumit, Clalit, Maccabi and several perinatal (baby care) centers Tipat Halav.

Education
There is a number of schools in the township.

Sewage
Until 2009, Ar'arat an-Naqab's sewage either went through an old purification facility or into one of several pools that were created in the 1980s and posed an environmental hazard. As a result of the construction and expansion of nearby Nevatim Airbase, the Israel Air Force invested in the purification facility, making it modern and sufficient for the needs of the village as well as the airbase.

See also
 Arab localities in Israel
 Negev Bedouin

References

External links
 Lands of the Negev, a short film presented by Israel Land Administration describing the challenges faced in providing land management and infrastructure to the Bedouins in Israel's southern Negev region

Populated places established in 1982
Arab localities in Israel
Bedouin localities in Israel
Local councils in Southern District (Israel)
Populated places in Southern District (Israel)
1982 establishments in Israel